Boob McNutt was a comic strip by Rube Goldberg which ran from June 9, 1918 to September 23, 1934. It was syndicated by the McNaught Syndicate from 1922 until the end of its run.

Publication history 
Comics historian Don Markstein traced the history of the strip:

Story and characters 
Boob McNutt was a clumsy, buffoonish fellow who was quite friendly and attempted to be helpful in his incompetent way. He was entrusted with tasks like caring for priceless works of art and the Elixir of Immortality, tasks in which he inevitably failed, usually in a destructive manner.

From 1922 to 1926, the strip focused on Boob's pursuit of his true love Pearl, whom he finally married, then divorced, then married again and divorced again. Goldberg inserted supporting characters from his other strips, including Mike and Ike (They Look Alike) and Bertha the Siberian Cheesehound. In 1934, he even brought in Professor Lucifer Gorgonzola Butts, inventor of those famed Rube Goldberg machines, for a brief sojourn before the strip was cancelled.

The strip had several Sunday toppers over the course of its run, including: Bertha the Siberian Cheesehound (Jan 10-July 4, 1926), Bill and Professor Butts (July 11, 1926 - Sept 23, 1934), Boob McNutt's Ark (Jan 8, 1933 - Feb 4, 1934), Are You Saving Jokers? (Feb 11-May 13, 1934) and Boob McNutt's Geography (May 20-Sept 23, 1934).

Legacy 
In his seminal 1923 essay, "The Seven Lively Arts", Gilbert Seldes called Boob McNutt "the least worthy of Rube Goldberg's astonishing creations". Boob was vindicated, however, when he was featured on the front cover of Nemo #24.

References

Sources
 Strickler, Dave. Syndicated Comic Strips and Artists, 1924-1995: The Complete Index. Cambria, California: Comics Access, 1995. 

1915 comics debuts
1934 comics endings
McNutt, Boob
American comic strips
Gag-a-day comics
McNutt, Boob
McNutt, Boob